The Renewable Fuels Regulators Club (or REFUREC) is a network of governmental institutions that offers a pan-European platform for discussion, information exchange and tackling cross-border issues relating to the biofuels market in the European Union and beyond.

REFUREC was initiated in 2009 by the Renewable Fuels Agency, a UK Government non-departmental public body, created by the Department for Transport to implement the Renewable Transport Fuel Obligation or RTFO.

Function
The Renewable Fuels Regulators Club was established to help address consistent implementation and regulation of the biofuels market. By facilitating and fostering stronger working relations between counterparts working in the field throughout Europe, REFUREC aims to minimise the regulatory burden of the new rules, and to maximise the overall effectiveness of the Renewables Directive.

Structure
REFUREC is an informal network, participation is voluntary and not binding. There are no membership fees involved. The network organises two till four formal meetings a year to share knowledge, ideas and strategies on how best to implement workable interpretations of the Renewables Directive across respective borders. The member states of the EU and the European Free Trade Association (EFTA) have evolved different methods of regulating biofuel consumption. The different starting points, combined with the intrinsic subtleties and complexities of the legislation are what lead REFUREC to believe that this kind of close co-operation is key to successful implementation of the Renewables Directive.

In addition to formal meetings, REFUREC organises topic-specific ad-hoc meetings, facilitates internal working groups with interested member state organisations participating, and coordinates pan-European information exchange in between the formal meetings.

The administrative part is provided by an informal, rotating secretariat. April 2011 - June 2012, the Spanish Comisión Nacional de Energía (CNE) led on the secretariat work and successfully handed over in July 2012 to the Dutch Emissions Authority (Nederlandse Emissieautoriteit, Netherlands). October 2013 - September 2015, the Swedish Energy Agency coordinated the secretariat work. In October 2015, the Finnish Energy Authority took the lead and provided secretariat support for two years, before Orkustofnun, Iceland's National Energy Authority, took over until September 2019. Since October 2019, Ireland's National Oil Reserves Agency holds responsibility for two years.

Meetings
The inaugural meeting was held on 4 February 2010 in London, and was attended by representatives from the UK, Denmark, France, Germany, Hungary, the Netherlands, Portugal, the Republic of Ireland, the Slovak Republic, Spain, Sweden, and the European Commission. To date, further workshops have been held in Brussels, Bonn, Madrid, The Hague, Copenhagen, Lisbon, Stockholm, Valletta, Dublin, Oslo, Luxembourg, Paris, Bratislava, Helsinki, Vienna, Tallinn, Reykjavik, and Warsaw.

Member organisations
Since its kick-off meeting in 2009, membership has grown rapidly and currently organisations from 31 countries are participating. REFUREC has matured into a successful network of biofuel sustainability regulators, and into a positive model of European co-operation.

External links
Renewable Fuels Regulators Club

References

Bioenergy organizations
Biofuels